A National Special Security Event (NSSE) is an event of national or international significance deemed by the United States Department of Homeland Security (DHS) to be a potential target for terrorism or other criminal activity.  These events have included summits of world leaders, meetings of international organizations, presidential nominating conventions and presidential inaugurations.  NSSE designation requires federal agencies to provide full cooperation and support to ensure the safety and security of those participating in or otherwise attending the event, and the community within which the event takes place, and is typically limited to specific event sites for a specified time frame.

An NSSE places the United States Secret Service as the lead agency in charge of the planning, coordination, and implementation of security operations for the event, the Federal Bureau of Investigation in charge of intelligence, counterterrorism, and investigation of major criminal activities associated with the event, and the Federal Emergency Management Agency in charge of recovery management in the aftermath of terrorism, major criminal activities, natural disasters, or other catastrophic incidents following the event. Like the FBI and FEMA, the Secret Service brings in local law enforcement, public safety, and military experts to assist with developing the plan, and give them the special guidance and training to operate within the security plan. NSSE designation is not a funding mechanism, and currently there is no specific federal "pot of money" to be distributed to state and local governments within whose jurisdiction NSSEs take place.

Authority
NSSE procedures were established by President Bill Clinton in a portion of Presidential Decision Directive 62 in May 1998, which set out the security roles for federal agencies at major events.

Procedure
A number of factors are taken into consideration when designating an event as a National Special Security Event.  Department of Homeland Security press releases usually cite the following factors:

Anticipated attendance by dignitaries. Events attended by officials of the United States government or foreign dignitaries may create an independent federal interest to ensure that the event transpires without incident and that sufficient resources are brought to bear in the event of an incident.
Size of the event. A large number of attendees and participants generally increases security requirements.  In addition, larger events are more likely to draw the attention of terrorists or other criminals, particularly those interested in employing weapons of mass destruction.
Significance of the event. Some events have historical, political, cultural, or other symbolic significance that may heighten concern about possible terrorist acts or other criminal activity.
Duration of the event. State and local law enforcement and public safety agencies may possess the manpower and other resources to provide adequate security for a major event within their jurisdiction (e.g. World Series, NASCAR race, Super Bowl, televised awards show), but unable to do so for events over several days or weeks and at the same time continue to meet routine obligations in the greater community.
Availability of state and local resources.  When state and local jurisdictions lack the expertise, experience, manpower or other assets needed to ensure comprehensive protection of these major events of national or international significance.
Multiplicity of Jurisdictions. Extensive coordination of law enforcement and public safety agencies from multiple jurisdictions.
Threat assessments. Anticipation of terrorism, or extensive illegal civil disobedience or other criminal activity.

Typical NSSE security measures include:

 Interagency coordination and interoperability
 Heavy police (days off and leaves may be canceled) and often National Guard presence
 Police dogs for bomb detection
 Surveillance
 WMD detection, mitigation, and decontamination
 Sharpshooters and other tactical capabilities
 Flight restrictions around the area
 United States Coast Guard patrols
 Increased railroad security
 Extensive road closures
 When applicable members of Joint Task Force - Civil Support and the Chemical Biological Incident Response Force (CBIRF) are deployed

The Secret Service notes that since the "Presidential Protection Act of 2000 became public law...the Secret Service is authorized to participate in the planning, coordination and implementation of security operations at special events of national significance....[and that] when an event is designated by the Secretary of Homeland Security as a National Special Security Event (NSSE), the Secret Service assumes its mandated role as the lead agency for the design and implementation of the operational security plan...The goal of the cooperating agencies is to provide a safe and secure environment for Secret Service protectees, other dignitaries, the event participants and the general public. There is a tremendous amount of advance planning and coordination in preparation for these events."

Events
 paragraph (e)(2) requires that, at the end of each federal fiscal year, the executive branch report to Congress which events were designated NSSEs, and what criteria were used to make the designations.

Typical types of NSSEs are state funerals, major political conventions,  and the State of the Union addresses. The table below lists some NSSEs since enactment of the relevant statute.

References

External links
 United States Secret Service: National Special Security Event - Wayback Machine (Archive)
 DHS Fact Sheet: National Special Security Events - Wayback Machine (Archive) in January 2007
 DHS Fact Sheet: National Special Security Events - Wayback Machine (Archive) in March 2012
 CRS report on NSSEs
 Center for Domestic Preparedness - NSSE NLE Support - FEMA
 National Special Security Events: Fact Sheet - CRS
 Anatomy of a National Special Security Event
 Section 7.0. NSSE Overview Fact Sheet - Department of Transportation

Law enforcement in the United States
Terrorism laws in the United States
United States Department of Homeland Security
United States federal defense and national security legislation